The Northern Athletics Collegiate Conference (NACC), formerly the Northern Athletics Conference (NAC), is a college athletic conference.  It participates in the NCAA's Division III and began its first season in the fall of 2006.

The NACC sponsors 21 sports. Men's sports include baseball, basketball, cross country, football, golf, lacrosse, soccer, tennis, indoor track & field, outdoor track & field, and volleyball. Women's squads are fielded in basketball, cross country, golf, lacrosse, soccer, softball, tennis, indoor track & field, outdoor track & field and volleyball. The newest NACC sports are men's volleyball, added in the 2017–18 school year, and men's and women's lacrosse, added in the 2020-21 school year.

The NACC became eligible for automatic NCAA postseason berths in 2008–09.

History

The Northern Athletics Collegiate Conference began its first season of competition in the fall of 2006 as the Northern Athletics Conference.  The name change took place at the beginning of the 2013–14 academic year.  The NACC consists of 13 colleges and universities from the shared-border states of Illinois and Wisconsin. Many have shared traditional rivalries dating back to the NACC's predecessor conferences: the Lake Michigan Conference and the Northern Illinois-Iowa Conference.

Charter members include: Alverno College, Aurora University, Benedictine University, Concordia University Chicago, Concordia University Wisconsin, Dominican University, Edgewood College, Lakeland University, Maranatha Baptist University, Marian University, Rockford College and Wisconsin Lutheran College.

Just three changes to the league's core membership have occurred, as the Milwaukee School of Engineering joined the NAC in the fall of 2007, and Maranatha withdrew from the league in the summer of 2013. In 2017, the Illinois Institute of Technology announced that they would be joining the NACC for the 2018 athletic season, coinciding with their acceptance as a full NCAA Division III member.

Also in 2017, Benedictine, which had been contemplating a move to NCAA Division II, was formally invited to join the D-II Great Lakes Valley Conference (GLVC), pending NCAA approval of its entry into the D-II transition process. Benedictine formally applied to begin this transition in advance of a February 1, 2018 deadline, and was officially approved to enter the transition process in July of that year. In October 2018, Benedictine reversed course and rescinded its request to withdraw from the NACC.

The most recent membership change was announced on April 3, 2019, when St. Norbert College, already slated to become an associate member in men's volleyball (and, subsequently, men's and women's golf) in 2019–20, was upgraded to full NACC membership effective in 2021–22.

Chronological timeline
 2006 - The NACC was founded as the Northern Athletics Conference (NAC). Charter members include: Alverno College, Concordia University Wisconsin, Dominican University, Edgewood College, Lakeland College (now Lakeland University), Maranatha Baptist Bible College (now Maranatha Baptist University), Marian University and Wisconsin Lutheran College (from the Lake Michigan Conference (LMC)), and Aurora University, Benedictine University, Concordia University Chicago and Rockford College (from the Northern Illinois-Iowa Conference (NIIC)), effective beginning the 2006-07 academic year.
 2007 - The Milwaukee School of Engineering (MSoE) (also a former member from the defunct Lake Michigan Conference) joined the NAC after spending a season as an NCAA D-III Independent school, effective in the 2007-08 academic year.
 2011 - Bethany Lutheran College, Martin Luther College, the University of Minnesota Morris, University of Northwestern – St. Paul and Presentation College joined the NAC as affiliate members for women's golf, effective in the 2012 spring season (2011-12 academic year).
 2012 - Presentation left the NAC as an affiliate member for women's golf to return back to the National Association of Intercollegiate Athletics (NAIA), effective after the 2012 spring season (2011-12 school year).
 2013 - Maranatha Baptist left the NAC to become an NCAA D-III Independent school, effective after the 2012-13 school year.
 2013 - The NAC has been rebranded as the Northern Athletics Collegiate Conference (NACC), effective in the 2013-14 school year.
 2013 - Northland College joined the NACC as an affiliate member for women's golf, effective in the 2014 spring season (2013-14 academic year).
 2015 - Bethany Lutheran, Minnesota–Morris, Northwestern (Minn.) and Northland left the NACC as affiliate members for women's golf, effective after the 2015 spring season (2014-15 academic year).
 2015 - Mount Mary University joined the NACC as an affiliate member for women's cross country, effective in the 2015 fall season (2015-16 academic year).
 2017 - The Illinois Institute of Technology (Illinois Tech) joined the NACC, effective in the 2018-19 academic year.
 2018 - Eureka College joined the NACC as an affiliate member for football, effective in the 2018 fall season (2018-19 academic year).
 2019 - St. Norbert College joined the NACC as an affiliate member for men's volleyball, men's golf and women's golf, effective in the 2019-20 academic year.
 2021 - St. Norbert had upgraded to join the NACC for all sports, effective in the 2021-22 academic year.
 2021 - Beloit College joined the NACC as an associate member for men's and women's lacrosse, effective in the 2022 spring season (2021-22 academic year).

Member schools

Current members
The NACC currently has 14 full members, all are private schools:

Notes

Associate members 
The NACC currently has three associate members, all are private schools:

Former member
The NACC had one full member that competed in the conference, which was also a private school:

Former associate members
The NACC had six former associate members in the conference, which most were private schools, except Minnesota–Morris, which was a public school:

Membership timeline

Sports

Fall
 men's & women's cross country
 men's football
 men's & women's golf
 men's & women's soccer
 women's tennis
 women's volleyball

Winter

 men's & women's basketball
 men's & women's indoor track and field

Spring
 men's baseball
 men's & women's lacrosse
 men's & women's outdoor track and field
 women's softball
 men's tennis
 men's volleyball

References

External links